Davit Bek is a village in the Kapan Municipality of the Syunik Province in Armenia. It is named after the Armenian patriotic leader David Bek. 

The village is the birthplace of Aram Manukian, the Armenian revolutionary leader and the founder of the First Republic of Armenia. The Surp Gayane Church of Davit Bek was opened in 2008.

Etymology 
The village was previously known as Zeyva.

Demographics 
The 2011 Armenia census reported its population as 796, down from 809 at the 2001 census.

Gallery

References 

Populated places in Syunik Province